Beylikova Dam is a dam in Eskişehir Province, Turkey. It was built between 1996 and 2002.

See also
List of dams and reservoirs in Turkey

References
DSI

Dams in Eskişehir Province
Dams completed in 2002
2002 establishments in Turkey